Masquerade is the fourth studio album by the artist The Legendary Tigerman, released in 2006.

Track listing 
 Someone Burned Down This Town
 The Whole World's Got The Eyes On You
 I Got My Night Off
 Say Hey Hey
 Honey, You're Too Much
 Route 66 (Bobby Troupe)
 Walkin’ Downtown
 Masquerade
 Let Me Give It To You
 Blue Moon Baby (Dave Diddley Day)
 Bad Luck Rhythm’N’ Blues Machine

References 
Get Hip <https://web.archive.org/web/20111003171107/http://www.gethip.com/web/catalog/legendary-tiger-man-masquerade-gh-1145-cd/>

2006 albums
The Legendary Tigerman albums